Nathaniel Barrington Pinney (born 28 December 1990) is an English footballer who plays for Corinthian-Casuals as a striker.

Career
Born in South Norwood, London, Pinney joined Crystal Palace and made his league debut on 11 April 2009, coming on in the 89th minute, as a substitute for Rui Fonte, in a 2–0 home defeat to Cardiff City.

Having made only one other appearance for Crystal Palace, in a League Cup game against Yeovil Town in August 2010, Pinney signed for Dagenham and Redbridge in October 2010 on a one-month loan and Conference South leaders Braintree Town on a short-term loan in March 2011.

Pinney joined Ebbsfleet United of the Conference National on 5 November 2011 on an initial one-month loan. This was extended by a further month on 5 December 2011. After impressing at Ebbsfleet his loan was extended to the end of the season, he has been used in a few roles, playing on both wings and as a striker. He was officially released by Crystal Palace on 30 April 2012.

Answering a call from newly appointed Carshalton Athletic manager Tommy Williams, Pinney joined the club in October 2012. He scored 21 league goals for the Isthmian League Premier Division club in the 2012–13 season.

Pinney gained some national attention in late 2012, when he was named in an interview by then Crystal Palace and England winger Wilfried Zaha as the player he could not displace in the Palace youth set-up.

Pinney joined Conference South club Eastbourne Borough from previous club Kingstonian on 11 December 2014. Pinney made his debut for Borough in a 3–2 defeat to Chelmsford City on 13 December 2014. He came on in the 75th minute as a substitute and scored in the 81st which almost got Borough the draw but Chelmsford scored in stoppage time to take the win. He then made his home debut a week later against league leaders Boreham Wood as an 86th-minute substitute, scoring Borough's fourth goal in a 4–1 win.

Pinney was voted Eastbourne's Player of the Year and finished as top scorer for the club for the 2015–16 season. Pinney scored the only goal in the final of the 2015–16 Sussex Senior Cup, winning the cup for Eastbourne Borough.

Pinney was released by The Sports in October 2017, signing briefly for St Albans City before returning to Sussex to join Whitehawk in December. Pinney scored 10 minutes into his debut at East Thurrock United on 23 December 2017. He left the Hawks for Welling United at the end of the season but returned to Whitehawk in November 2018.

Career statistics

References

External links

1990 births
Living people
Footballers from the London Borough of Croydon
People from South Norwood
English footballers
Association football forwards
Crystal Palace F.C. players
Woking F.C. players
Dagenham & Redbridge F.C. players
Braintree Town F.C. players
Ebbsfleet United F.C. players
Eastbourne Borough F.C. players
Croydon F.C. players
Carshalton Athletic F.C. players
Tonbridge Angels F.C. players
Dulwich Hamlet F.C. players
English Football League players
National League (English football) players
Isthmian League players
Black British sportspeople
Kingstonian F.C. players
Whitehawk F.C. players